Nikolaos "Nikos" Gkikas (alternate spelling: Gikas) (Greek: Νικόλαος "Νίκος" Γκίκας; born November 22, 1990) is a Greek professional basketball player and the team captain for Promitheas Patras of the Greek Basket League and the EuroCup. He is a 6'1 " (1.86 m) tall point guard.

Professional career
After playing basketball at the Greek amateur and minor league levels with Filathlitikos, from 2008 to 2012, Gkikas started his pro career in 2012, with Filathlitikos in the Greek 2nd Division. During the seasons that Gkikas played at Filathlitikos, he played with players such as Giannis Antetokounmpo, Thanasis Antetokounmpo, Michalis Kamperidis, and Christos Saloustros, during the club's peak years. During the 2012–13 season, Gkikas almost gained a league promotion with Filathlitikos, but at the end of the season, the club finished in 3rd place in the Greek 2nd Division, just missing the league promotion to the Greek 1st Division.

Gkikas moved to the Greek 1st Division club Aris, in 2013. During the two years he played at Aris, his numbers dropped, due to the limited playing time he had with the club. On 15 January 2015, after leaving Aris, Gkikas signed with the Baltic League club Ventspils. With Ventspils, he led the 2014–15 Baltic Baltic League in assists per game, and was one of the key players of the team.

He spent the 2015–16 season with the Greek club Nea Kifissia. On July 17, 2016, Gkikas signed a two-year deal with the Greek club Promitheas Patras. On June 19, 2017, after being one of the best players of Promitheas in the 2016–17 season, he renewed his contract with the club for two more years. He then became the team captain.

On July 4, 2019, Gkikas signed a three-year contract with AEK Athens. In the 2020-2021 season, Gkikas averaged 6.9 points, 1.7 rebounds, and 2.5 assists, playing 17.4 minutes per contest.

On August 6, 2021, Gkikas signed back with his former team Promitheas Patras. In 22 league games, he averaged 7.2 points, 2.5 rebounds, 5.9 assists and 1.7 steals, playing around 24 minutes per contest. On June 21, 2022, playing against Larisa for the Greek Basket League playoffs, Gkikas achieved a career-high of 20 points and 13 assists. On June 28 of the same year, Gkikas officially renewed his contract for one more season.

National team career
Gkikas became a member of the senior men's Greek national basketball team in 2017. He played at the 2019 FIBA European World Cup qualification.

Career statistics

Domestic Leagues

Regular season

|-
| 2017–18
| style="text-align:left;"| Promitheas
| align=center | GBL
| 26 || 25.4 || .377 || .317 || .768 || 2.5 || 6.2 || 1.3 || 0 || 9.4
|-
| 2018–19
| style="text-align:left;"| Promitheas
| align=center | GBL
| 25 || 18.5 || .286 || .226 || .808 || 2.0 || 3.8 || .9 || 0 || 5.1
|}

FIBA Champions League

|-
| style="text-align:left;" | 2018–19
| style="text-align:left;" | Promitheas
| 15 || 23.0 || .386 || .351 || .857 || 2.5 || 4.8 || 1.7 || 0 || 8.9
|}

References

External links
FIBA Profile
FIBA Champions League Profile
Eurobasket.com Profile
Draftexpress.com Profile
Greek Basket League Profile 
Greek Basket League Profile 
Baltic League Profile

1990 births
Living people
AEK B.C. players
Aris B.C. players
BK Ventspils players
EFAO Zografou B.C. players
Greek men's basketball players
Nea Kifissia B.C. players
Point guards
Promitheas Patras B.C. players
Basketball players from Athens